Nikolai Alexandrovich Khabibulin (born January 13, 1973) is a Russian former professional ice hockey goaltender. Known by the nickname "The Bulin Wall", he spent the majority of his playing career in the National Hockey League (NHL) with the Winnipeg Jets, Phoenix Coyotes, Chicago Blackhawks, Tampa Bay Lightning, and Edmonton Oilers.

Khabibulin excelled at the international level, winning two Olympic medals (gold and bronze) and was named Best Goaltender at the 2002 Winter Olympics. He was the first Russian goaltender to ever win the Stanley Cup, doing so with Tampa Bay in 2004; until 2020, he was also the only Russian goaltender to start in the Finals. He was also a four-time NHL All-Star.

Playing career

Winnipeg Jets/Phoenix Coyotes (1994–99)
Khabibulin was selected in the ninth round of the 1992 NHL Entry Draft by the Winnipeg Jets. In the 1993–94 season, he played with the touring Russian Penguins and by the start of the NHL season in January 1995, was playing in the NHL. In 1996, he moved with the Jets to Phoenix, Arizona, where they became the Phoenix Coyotes. In five years with the Jets/Coyotes franchise, he started at least 60 games in three of those seasons (including two instances in which he played 70 games), a heavy workload for a goaltender. Although the team made the Stanley Cup playoffs each of these years, some claimed that their first-round exits were partly due to Khabibulin being fatigued from playing so many regular season games.

After the 1998–99 season, Khabibulin became embroiled in a bitter contract dispute with the Coyotes, and ended up holding out for an entire season. During this year, he played for the Long Beach Ice Dogs of the International Hockey League (IHL), earning the James Gatschene Memorial Trophy as league MVP.

Tampa Bay Lightning (2001–2004)
On March 5, 2001, Khabibulin was traded to the Tampa Bay Lightning in exchange for Mike Johnson, Paul Mara, Ruslan Zainullin and the New York Islanders' second-round choice (previously acquired; Phoenix selected Matthew Spiller). Khabibulin quickly signed a contract with Tampa Bay and by the next season, he re-emerged as a premier goaltender. At the 2002 NHL All-Star Game his flawless, 20-save third period allowed the World All-Stars to rally for a comeback 8–5 win. Though Éric Dazé of the Chicago Blackhawks was chosen as the All-Star MVP, Khabibulin's play was the talk of both locker rooms. Indeed, many players were surprised that Khabibulin wasn't named MVP, an honour they felt was deserved and obvious. MVP voting was allegedly conducted with about five minutes remaining in the game while the North American All-Stars still held the lead.

Joined by budding superstars Vincent Lecavalier, Martin St. Louis and Brad Richards, Khabibulin helped lead the Lightning back to the playoffs in 2003, their first appearance since 1996, and then to a Stanley Cup in 2004, the first in franchise history. Khabibulin recorded five shutouts in 23 playoff games, including three shutouts in the first-round match-up against the New York Islanders (tied for an NHL record for most shutouts in a playoff round). Unlike his time in Phoenix, Khabibulin could enjoy extended rest when needed due to the skill of his backup, John Grahame.

During the 2004–05 NHL lockout, Khabibulin was one of many Russian players to return to their homeland. From November 2004, he played for Ak Bars Kazan in Kazan.

Chicago Blackhawks (2005–2009)

As the National Hockey League Players Association (NHLPA) ratified a new collective bargaining agreement (CBA), Khabibulin became a free agent when play was set to resume. Coming off his Stanley Cup win the previous NHL season, the Chicago Blackhawks signed him to a four-year, $27 million deal, making him the highest paid goaltender in the League. Injuries and inconsistent play, however, plagued him during his tenure in Chicago. In his first season with the Blackhawks, he recorded a 3.35 goals against average (GAA) — the highest of his career since his rookie season in Winnipeg — and Chicago finished second-to-last in the Western Conference.

In July 2008, the Blackhawks signed goaltender Cristobal Huet, previously of the Washington Capitals. The signing of Huet was thought to have effectively displaced Khabibulin as the starting goaltender, especially given he was put on waivers on September 29, 2008, but cleared. In light of Huet and Khabibulin's combined salaries (Huet was signed to a contract averaging $5.6 million per season), it was speculated Khabibulin would be traded to provide cap space. However, he spent the entire season with the team, playing in 42 games, and by the start of the 2009 playoffs, he had retrenched himself as starting goaltender. Khabibulin and the Blackhawks defeated the Calgary Flames and Vancouver Canucks to progress to the Western Conference Finals against the Detroit Red Wings. During the third game of the series, Khabibulin surrendered three goals in one period after shutting out the Red Wings in the previous period. He was replaced by Huet for the third period due to a lower body injury. Khabibulin missed the remaining three games of the series as a result of the injury.

Edmonton Oilers (2009–2013)

On July 1, 2009, Khabibulin signed a four-year, $15 million contract with the Edmonton Oilers, replacing Dwayne Roloson as the Oilers' starting goaltender.

His Oilers debut on October 3 against the Calgary Flames was a blunder, however. While trying to field a clearing pass in the final minute of the third period, he mishandled the puck and gave up the game-winning goal to Flames' right wing David Moss.

On January 13, 2010, it was announced that Khabibulin would have surgery to repair a herniated disk in his back. He missed the remainder of the regular season.

Khabibulin kicked off the 2010–11 season with a 37-save performance in a 4–0 victory over the Calgary Flames. However, injuries once again limited his action. He recorded a very poor record of 10–32–3, as the Oilers were once again last place in the Western Conference.

Due to Khabibulin's strong play in October of the 2011–12 season, posting a 5–0–2 record, with an NHL-leading .960 save percentage and a 1.12 GAA, he was named the Third Star of the Month. However, Khabibulin's play fell off in the second half of the season, and he ended the season with an average 2.65 GAA and a .910 save percentage. In the lockout-shortened 2012–13 season, his former backup, Devan Dubnyk, replaced him as the team's starting goaltender. This was Khabibulin's first season as a backup.

Return to Chicago (2013–14)
On July 5, 2013, Khabibulin signed a one-year, $2 million contract to play for the Blackhawks for the 2013–14 season. It was his second stint with Chicago after previously playing for them from 2005 to 2009. He served as the backup goaltender to Corey Crawford.

Khabibulin suffered an injury in a loss to the Nashville Predators on November 16, 2013, and was placed on injured reserve the next day. As a result, goaltender Antti Raanta was recalled from the Blackhawks' American Hockey league (AHL) affiliate, the Rockford IceHogs. He never played another game in the NHL after sustaining the hip injury. Khabibulin announced his intentions to retire on November 13, 2015. He has expressed an interest in continuing his hockey career in  management.

International play

Khabibulin made his international debut with the Soviet Union at the 1991 European Junior Championships. He appeared in the 1992 World Junior Championships the next year and won a gold medal with the CIS, appearing in six games. Khabibulin and the national team had begun the tournament as the Soviet Union, but the state was dissolved following the round robin on New Year's Day, thus they proceeded to compete as the Commonwealth of Independent States (CIS).

That same year, Khabibulin appeared in the 1992 Winter Olympics with the CIS as the third goaltender. He remains the last active player from Russia to win the Olympic Games. Controversy arose after the CIS captured the gold medal when legendary Russian coach Viktor Tikhonov kept a medal for himself (coaches and management are not awarded medals in Olympic hockey) instead of allowing Khabibulin to have one, as Khabibulin had not played a game in the tournament. This is speculated to be the reason for Khabibulin boycotting the Russian team in later international tournaments.

At the 2002 Winter Olympics, in which the 1992 gold medal conflict was resolved, Khabibulin established himself as the national team's starting goaltender. He helped Russia to a bronze medal while appearing in all six games, and was named Best Goaltender of the tournament.
Also at the 2002 Winter Olympics in Salt Lake City, Khabibulin was finally awarded his 1992 Olympic gold medal in a private locker room ceremony with teammates and the Russian Hockey Federation.

After his second season with the Winnipeg Jets of the NHL, Khabibulin competed with Russia in the 1996 World Cup. He appeared in two games.

Khabibulin was called up again in the 2006 Winter Olympics in Turin, but missed the tournament due to injury. Russia's starting goaltender was the San Jose Sharks' Evgeni Nabokov. Khabibulin did not play a game in either tournament, in which Russia failed to win a medal.

Personal life
On February 8, 2010, Khabibulin was pulled over in Arizona by a police officer for surpassing the legal speed limit by 25 miles per hour. The officer noted various signs that suggested Khabibulin could have been under the influence of alcohol, and proceeded to administer a field sobriety test. Khabibulin was subsequently arrested and charged with speeding and impaired driving.

On July 7, 2010, Khabibulin's court case was postponed. On August 27, 2010, Khabibulin was found guilty of excessive speed, extreme DUI and DUI over the 0.08 level. On August 31, 2010, he received the minimum sentence of 30 days in jail, which he then tried to appeal. On July 26, 2011, Khabibulin withdrew the appeal, and was sentenced to 30 days in jail. He was in a jail for half of the time, and under house arrest for the other half. Khabibulin served his sentence in Joe Arpaio's Tent City jail.

Khabibulin helped Victoria Azarenka settle in Scottsdale when she moved from Belarus to pursue a career in tennis. His wife is friends with Azarenka's mother and decided to help her. They have become close friends since. Khabibulin's daughter, Sasha, is the wife of former NHL player Robert Nilsson.

Awards and achievements

NHL
Played in the NHL All-Star Game — 1998, 1999, 2002, 2003
 2004 NHL Stanley Cup champion — Tampa Bay Lightning
 NHL 1997 Stanley Cup Playoffs — Save percentage Leader (.932)
 NHL 2004 Stanley Cup Playoffs — Wins Leader (16)
 NHL 2004 Stanley Cup Playoffs — Shutouts Leader (5)
 Tied NHL record for most Shutouts in a Playoff Round — (3)
 2011–12 season — Lowest GAA through the first nine games of a season since the NHL expansion (1967–68 season) (0.98)

International
1992 Winter Olympics (Ice Hockey) – Gold Medal
2002 Winter Olympics (Ice Hockey) – Bronze Medal
2002 Winter Olympics (Ice Hockey) – Best Goaltender Award (Directorate)

Other
Won the James Gatschene Memorial Trophy (IHL) MVP) in 2000.

Career statistics

Regular season and playoffs

International

See also
 List of NHL goaltenders with 300 wins

References

External links
 

1973 births
Living people
Ak Bars Kazan players
Avtomobilist Yekaterinburg players
Chicago Blackhawks players
Edmonton Oilers players
HC CSKA Moscow players
Ice hockey players at the 1992 Winter Olympics
Ice hockey players at the 2002 Winter Olympics
Long Beach Ice Dogs (IHL) players
Medalists at the 1992 Winter Olympics
Medalists at the 2002 Winter Olympics
National Hockey League All-Stars
Olympic bronze medalists for Russia
Olympic gold medalists for the Unified Team
Olympic ice hockey players of Russia
Olympic ice hockey players of the Unified Team
Olympic medalists in ice hockey
Sportspeople from Yekaterinburg
Phoenix Coyotes players
Russian ice hockey goaltenders
Russian Penguins players
Soviet ice hockey goaltenders
Sportspeople convicted of crimes
Springfield Falcons players
Stanley Cup champions
Tampa Bay Lightning players
Winnipeg Jets (1979–1996) draft picks
Winnipeg Jets (1979–1996) players